Jackson Historic District may refer to:

Jackson Historic District (Jackson, Alabama), listed on the National Register of Historic Places (NRHP) in Clarke County, Alabama
West Jackson Boulevard District, Chicago, Illinois, also known as West Jackson Historic District, NRHP-listed
Jackson Historic District (Jackson, Louisiana), NRHP-listed
Grove Street-Jackson Historic District, Vicksburg, Mississippi, listed on the NRHP in Warren County, Mississippi
Jackson Historic District (Jackson, North Carolina), [[National Register of Historic Places listings in Northampton County, North Carolina
Mount Jackson Historic District, Mount Jackson, Virginia, listed on the NRHP in Shenandoah County, Virginia